Maria Te Huia is a former association football player who represented New Zealand at international level.

Te Huia made her Football Ferns début in a 2–2 draw with Korea Republic on 6 October 1979, and finished her international career with four caps to her credit.

References

Year of birth missing (living people)
Living people
New Zealand women's association footballers
New Zealand women's international footballers
Women's association footballers not categorized by position